Nicholas Nickleby is a novel by Charles Dickens published as a serial from 1838 to 1839.

Nicholas Nickleby may also refer to several adaptations of the novel:

 Nicholas Nickleby (1903 film)
 Nicholas Nickleby (1912 film)
 The Life and Adventures of Nicholas Nickleby (1947 film)
 Nicholas Nickleby (1957 TV series), a BBC adaptation
 Nicholas Nickleby (1968 TV series), a BBC adaptation
 Nicholas Nickleby (1977 TV series), a BBC adaptation
 The Life and Adventures of Nicholas Nickleby (play), a 1980 stage adaptation
 The Life and Adventures of Nicholas Nickleby (1982 film) a TV film of the stage adaptation
 Nicholas Nickleby (1985 film)
 The Life and Adventures of Nicholas Nickleby (2001 film)
 Nicholas Nickleby (2002 film)